The Russification of Belarus is a policy of replacing the use of the Belarusian language and the presence of Belarusian culture and mentality in various spheres of public life in Belarus by the corresponding Russian analogs. Russification is one of the major reasons of insufficient adoption of the Belarusian language by Belarusians.

In Belarus, Russification was carried out by the authorities of the Russian Empire and, later, by the authorities of the Soviet Union. Belarusian president Alexander Lukashenko has renewed the policy since coming to power in 1994, although with signs of a "soft Belarusization" after 2014.

Components of Russification
The Russification of Belarus comprises several components:
 Russification of education
 Transfer of education in Belarus to the Russian language
 Repressions of Belarusian elites standing on the positions of national independence and building a Belarusian state on the basis of Belarusian national attributes
 Soviet repressions in Belarus
 Codification of the Belarusian language to bring it closer to Russian
 Narkamaŭka
 Declaring Russian as the second official language created conditions for crowding out the Belarusian language
 Destruction or modification of national architecture
 List of architectural monuments of the Grand Duchy of Lithuania, destroyed by the authorities of the Russian Empire 
 List of historical and architectural monuments of Belarus, destroyed by Soviet authorities 
 List of historical and architectural monuments of Belarus, destroyed by the Moscow Patriarchate 
 Renaming of settlements, streets and other geographical objects in honor of Russian figures or according to Russian tradition
 The dominance of Russian television, Russian products in the media space of Belarus
 Lack of conditions for the use of the Belarusian language in business and documents workflow
 Religious suppression and forced conversion
 Synod of Polotsk

Russification in Belarus under Lukashenko

Education 

In Minsk city for the 1994-1995 academic year, 58% of students in the first classes of elementary school were taught in the Belarusian language. After the beginning of Lukashenka's presidency in 1994, the number of these classes decreased. In 1999, only 5.3% of students in the first classes of elementary school were taught in the Belarusian language in Minsk.

In the academic year 2016-2017 near 128,000 students were taught in Belarusian language (13.3% of total). The vast majority of Belarusian-language schools located in rural areas that are gradually closed through the exodus of its population to the cities. Each year, there is a closure of about 100 small schools in Belarus, most of which use Belarusian language in teaching. There is a trend of transfer the students of these schools to Russian-language schools. Thus, there is a loss of students studying in Belarusian.

As for the cities, there are only seven Belarusian-language schools, six of which are in Minsk (in 2019). In other words, the capital city, regional and district centers of the Republic of Belarus has seven Belarusian-language schools in total:
 Gymnasium № 4 (Kuntsaushchyna street, 18 – Minsk, Frunzyenski District)
 Gymnasium № 9 (Siadykh street, 10 – Minsk, Pyershamayski District)
 Gymnasium № 14 (Vasnyatsova street, 10 – Minsk, Zavodski District)
 Gymnasium № 23 (Nezalezhnastsi Avenue, 45 – Minsk, Savyetski District)
 Gymnasium № 28 (Rakasouski Avenue, 93 – Minsk, Leninsky District)
 Secondary school № 60 (Karl Libkneht street, 82 – Minsk, Maskowski District)
 Secondary school № 4 (Savetskaya street, 78 – Ivanava city)

Explanations of the Russification Policy 

Officially, the Lukashenka regime gives no explanation for the reasons for forcing the policy of Russification after 1995.
There is suspicion in the Belarusian civil society that there is a hidden deal between the Lukashenka regime and the leadership of the Russian Federation. According to the alleged deal, the Lukashenka regime is committed to political loyalty to Russia and a policy of Russification in Belarus, narrowing the use of the Belarusian language in exchange for funds from Russia to retain power in Belarus.

A possible confirmation of the existence of such a deal could be the traditional emphasis of Russia's leadership on the expansion of the Russian language and culture to neighboring countries. The Kremlin criticized derussification in Ukraine that has been implemented since 2014, as well as derussification initiatives in Kazakhstan.

See also 
 Russification
 Belarusian national revival
 Belarusian nationalism
 Trasianka
 Polonization

References

External links 

 Ніна Баршчэўская. Русыфікацыя беларускае мовы ў асьвятленьні газэты «Беларус» // kamunikat.org 
 Павел Добровольский. Замки, храмы и ратуши. Кто, когда и зачем уничтожил исторический облик крупных городов Беларуси // TUT.BY

Further reading

Russification
Social history of Belarus
Anti-Belarusian sentiment
Belarus–Russia relations